Duratón can refer to:

Duratón, Segovia, the site of a Romanesque church.
Duratón (river), a river in Spain
Hoces del Río Duratón Natural Park (Parque Natural de las Hoces del Río Duratón).